Lindsay Davenport was the defending champion from when the event was last held in 2000, but she decided not to participate this year.

Amélie Mauresmo won the title, defeating Anastasia Myskina in the final, 5–7, 6–0, 6–2.

Seeds

Draw

Finals

Top half

Bottom half

References

2003 Women's Singles
Advanta Championships - Singles
Sports in Philadelphia
Tennis in Pennsylvania